Issa Fall (born 1947) is a Senegalese sprinter. He competed in the men's 4 × 100 metres relay at the 1980 Summer Olympics.

References

1947 births
Living people
Athletes (track and field) at the 1980 Summer Olympics
Senegalese male sprinters
Olympic athletes of Senegal
Place of birth missing (living people)